Admiral Sir John Richard Brigstocke  (30 July 1945 – 26 May 2020) was a senior Royal Navy officer who served as Second Sea Lord from 1997 to 2000.

Early life and education
Brigstocke was born on 30 July 1945. His father, George Brigstocke, was a former Anglican priest (having converted to Roman Catholicism), and his brother, Hugh, became a noted art historian. He was educated at West Downs School, Marlborough College and the Britannia Royal Naval College.

Naval career
Brigstocke joined the Royal Navy in 1962. He went on to be Flag Officer, Second Flotilla in January 1991 and then Commander United Kingdom Task Group in April 1992. After that he became Assistant Chief of the Naval Staff in September 1993 (and, concurrently President of the Royal Naval College, Greenwich from 1994), Flag Officer, Surface Flotilla in April 1995 and Second Sea Lord and Commander-in-Chief Naval Home Command in September 1997.

Later life
In retirement, Brigstocke became Chief Executive of the St Andrew's Group of Hospitals. In 2005 he became Chairman of Council of the University of Buckingham, and in 2006 he was appointed Chairman of NHS East Midlands. He also became Judicial Appointments and Conduct Ombudsman and a deputy lieutenant of Northamptonshire.

He died on 26 May 2020 at the age of 74.

References

|-

1945 births
2020 deaths
Admiral presidents of the Royal Naval College, Greenwich
Deputy Lieutenants of Northamptonshire
Knights Commander of the Order of the Bath
People educated at Marlborough College
People educated at West Downs School
Royal Navy admirals
Royal Navy personnel of the Gulf War